Rob Marshall (born 1968) is a British Formula One engineer, who currently works for the Red Bull Racing Formula One team.

Career

Marshall studied mechanical engineering on the Cardiff University. After his study, he went to work at the design department of Rolls-Royce.

He continued working for Benetton until the take over by Renault F1 team. Through a duration in which the team was taken over by Renault (2000–2002), Marshall worked his way through the ranks to eventually become Head of Mechanical Design and in 2005, his work, particularly the development of his innovative mass damper system, helped the team to its first Drivers' and Constructors’ Championship titles.

For the 2006 season, Marshall moved to the new Red Bull Racing team, where he worked with Adrian Newey in the role of Chief Designer. The introduction of hybrid engines to F1 led to a less successful spell, but with Marshall at the helm of the Red Bull's engineering department the podiums and victories have continued to flow. In 2016 Marshall was promoted to the position of chief engineering officer.

References 

Living people
1968 births
Formula One engineers
English motorsport people
Red Bull Racing
Alumni of Cardiff University
Benetton Formula
Renault in Formula One